Polish National Committee was as organisation created during the Greater Poland Uprising of 1848. It was organized on March 20, 1848, at the Hotel Bazar in Poznań.

During the uprising, the Polish people mounted a military insurrection in the Grand Duchy of Poznań (or the Greater Poland region) against the occupying Prussian forces.  The Committee was to serve as a legal organization representing Polish interests in negotiations with the Kingdom of Prussia.

The chairman of the committee was Gustaw Potworowski, and the other members included:

Maciej Mielżyński
Cyprian Jarochowski
Jędrzej Moraczewski
Walenty Stefański
Ryszard Berwiński
Jakub Krauthofer
Paweł Andrzejewski
Jan Palacz
Józef Chosłowski
Władysław Niegolewski
Pantaleon Szuman
Włodzimierz Wolniewicz
Antoni Kraszewski
doctor Teofil Matecki
pastor Jan Wilhelm Kassyusz
Karol Libelt
Józef Esman
Michał Słomczewski
prince Jan Janiszewski
prince Antoni Fromholz
Aleksy Prusinowski

Political history of Poland
Greater Poland Uprising (1848)
Organizations established in 1848
History of Poznań
19th-century establishments in the Province of Posen
19th century in Poznań